This is a list of women's firsts noting the first time that a woman or women achieved a given historical feat. A shorthand phrase for this development is "breaking the gender barrier" or "breaking the glass ceiling." Other terms related to the glass ceiling can be used for specific fields related to those terms, such as "breaking the brass ceiling" for women in the military and "breaking the stained glass ceiling" for women clergy.
Inclusion on the list is reserved for achievements by women that have significant historical impact.

General business
1500s: Philippine Welser, first European female billionaire.
1889: Anna Bissell, first female CEO in the United States of America.
1903: Maggie L. Walker, first African-American woman to charter a bank.
1915: Helena Rubinstein, the first woman to found a cosmetics company.
1945: Ruth Handler, the first president of a major toy company.
1961: Katherine Graham, first female to lead a Fortune 500 company.
1992: Alice Walton, first female decabillionaire.
1999: Andrea Jung, first female CEO of a MLM company. 
1999: Carly Fiorina, first female head of a Fortune 20 company.
2000: Martha Stewart, first self-made female American billionaire.
2003: Oprah Winfrey, first female African-American billionaire.
2013: Mary Barra, first female CEO of a major car manufacturer.
2019: Kylie Jenner, first female billionaire under 30.
2020: Rania Llewellyn, first female bank CEO in Canada.
2021: Kathryn Farmer, first female CEO of a major railroad.

Aviation and aerospace

Computing

Dentistry

1866: Lucy Hobbs Taylor, first American woman to earn a doctorate in dentistry.

Born Lucy Hobbs on March 14, 1833, in Constable, New York. She was initially denied admission to dental school, then began private study with a professor from the Ohio College of Dental Surgery. In November 1865, she entered the Ohio College of Dental Surgery, where in 1866 she earned her doctorate in dentistry, becoming the first woman in the United States to do so. She married James Taylor and he followed her into the practice of dentistry. The two moved to Lawrence, Kansas, where they practiced together until her husband's death in 1886. She retired and became active in women's rights, and died in 1910.

Education

History 
1148: Anna Komnene, the first woman historian, completes her work the Alexiad, which consists of 15 volumes written in Greek.

International bodies
1950: Geronima Pécson – first Filipino and first woman elected to the executive board of the United Nations Educational, Scientific and Cultural Organization (UNESCO).
1981: Jeane Kirkpatrick – First woman to serve as US Ambassador to the United Nations.
2021: Ngozi Okonjo-Iweala became the first female Director-General of the World Trade Organization.

Journalism 
 1946: Katharine Graham – first woman publisher of a major United States newspaper, The Washington Post.
 1973: Linda Carter Brinson – first woman assistant national editor at The Baltimore Sun.
 2002: Linda Carter Brinson – first woman editorial page editor at the Winston-Salem Journal.
 2004: Catherine Pepinster – first woman to be editor of British newspaper The Tablet in its 175-year history.

Library science

Mathematics

Military

Nobel Prizes
1903: Marie Sklodowska-Curie, first woman to win the Nobel Prize in Physics; she shared the prize with Antoine Henri Becquerel and Pierre Curie. First woman to win a Nobel Prize.
1905: Baroness Bertha Sophie Felicita von Suttner, first woman to win the Nobel Prize in Peace.
1909: Selma Lagerlöf, first woman to win the Nobel Prize in Literature.
1911: Marie Sklodowska-Curie, first woman to win the Nobel Prize in Chemistry. First person (and only woman to date) to win two Nobel Prizes. Only person to win a Nobel Prize in two different sciences.
1947: Gerty Cori, first woman to win the Nobel Prize in Physiology or Medicine; she shared the prize with Carl Ferdinand Cori and Bernardo Alberto Houssay. Although born in Prague, Gerty Cori is considered the first American woman to win a Nobel Prize in medicine. She had become a U.S. citizen in 1928.
1983: Barbara McClintock, first woman to win an unshared Nobel Prize in Physiology or Medicine.
2009: Elinor Ostrom, first woman to win the Nobel Prize in Economics, and the first American woman to do so; she shared the prize with Oliver E. Williamson.

Police

Politics

Historic firsts for women as heads of state or government:

Yevgenia Bosch, Ukrainian People's Republic (1917–1918), sometimes considered the first modern woman leader of a national government. She held the position of Minister of Interior and Acting Leader of the People's Secretariat of Ukraine, one of a number of competing ruling bodies in the Ukrainian People's Republic, the predecessor of Soviet Ukraine.
Khertek Anchimaa-Toka, Tuvan People's Republic (1940–1944): The first female head of state (Chairperson of the Presidium of the Little Khural) of a partially recognized country.
Sukhbaataryn Yanjmaa, Mongolia (1953–1954): The first female acting head of state (Chairperson of the Presidium of the State Great Khural).
Sirimavo Bandaranaike, Ceylon, now Sri Lanka (1960–1965): The first elected female prime minister (head of government) of a sovereign country. She served again 1970–77 and 1994–2000; in total she served for 17 years.
Indira Gandhi, India (1966–1977): The first female prime minister of a present-day G20 country. She served again 1980–1984.
Soong Ching-ling, China (1968–1972): The first female acting co-head of state (Co-Chairperson). She later served as Honorary President for 12 days in 1981.
Golda Meir, Israel (1969–1974): The first female prime minister in the Middle East.
Isabel Perón, Argentina (1974–1976): The first (appointed) female president, head of state and head of government.
Elisabeth Domitien, Central African Republic (1975–1976): The first (appointed) female prime minister of an African country.
Margaret Thatcher, United Kingdom (1979–1990): The first female prime minister of a G7/P5 country and the first female Prime Minister of a sovereign European country.
Eugenia Charles, Dominica (1980–1995): The longest continuously serving female prime minister.
Vigdís Finnbogadóttir, Iceland (1980–1996): The first democratically directly elected female president. With a presidency of exactly sixteen years, she also remains the longest-serving elected female head of state of any country to date.
Jeanne Sauvé, Canada (1984–1990): The first female head of state in North America.
Corazon Aquino, Philippines (1986–1992): The first woman president in Southeast Asia.
Benazir Bhutto, Pakistan (1988–1990): The first female prime minister of any muslim majority country. She served again 1993–96.
Kim Campbell, Canada (1993): The first female head of government in North America.
Tansu Çiller, Turkey (1993–1996): The first elected muslim female prime minister in Europe.
Chandrika Kumaratunga, Sri Lanka (1994–2000): The first time that a nation possessed a female president (Chandrika Kumaratunga) and a female prime minister (Sirimavo Bandaranaike) simultaneously. This also marked the first time that a female prime minister (Sirimavo Bandaranaike) directly succeeded another female prime minister (Chandrika Kumaratunga).
Ruth Perry, Liberia (1996–1997): The first (appointed) female head of state in Africa. Carmen Pereira of Guinea-Bissau and Sylvie Kinigi of Burundi had previously acted as head of state for 2 days and 101 days respectively.
Mary McAleese, Ireland (1997–2011): The first time that a female president directly succeeded another female president, Mary Robinson.
Ellen Johnson Sirleaf, Liberia (2006–2018): Africa's first elected female head of state.
Jóhanna Sigurðardóttir, Iceland (2009–2013): As prime minister, she was the world's first openly lesbian world leader, first female world leader to wed a same-sex partner while in office.
Elizabeth II, United Kingdom (1952–2022): In 2015, she became the longest-reigning queen regnant and female head of state in world history. In 2016, she became the longest currently serving head of state and longest currently reigning monarch.
Ursula von der Leyen, European Union (2019–present): The first woman to be appointed President of the European Commission.
Kamala Harris, United States (2021–present): The first woman to be inaugurated as Vice President of the United States in American history.
Sandra Mason, Barbados (2021–present): The first time that a country's first president was female (Barbados has not had a male president to date).
Giorgia Meloni, Italy (2022–present): The first woman to be elected in Italy as Head of government.

Racing 
 1949: Sara Christian became the first woman to race in NASCAR.
 1976: Janet Guthrie became the first woman to qualify and compete in the Indianapolis 500
1977: Janet Guthrie became the first woman to qualify and compete in the Daytona 500
1989: Shawna Robinson became the first woman to win a NASCAR-sanctioned stock car race, winning in the Charlotte/Daytona Dash Series at New Asheville Speedway.
2005: Danica Patrick became the first woman to lead the Indianapolis 500
2008: Danica Patrick became the first woman to win an Indy Car Series race.
2013: Danica Patrick became the first woman to race a complete full-time NASCAR Monster Energy Cup Series schedule.
2013: Danica Patrick became the first woman to win a pole position for NASCAR Monster Energy Cup Series in the 2013 Daytona 500.
2013: Danica Patrick became the first woman to lead the Daytona 500.

Religion

 1935: Regina Jonas first woman to be ordained as a rabbi.
 1980: Marjorie Matthews, first woman to become a bishop of the United Methodist Church.
 1989: Barbara Harris, first woman ordained a bishop in the Anglican Communion.
 March 12, 1994: The first women were ordained as Church of England priests; 32 women were ordained together.
 2000: Denise Wyss, first woman to be ordained as a priest in the Old Catholic Church.
 2003: Alison Elliot was elected the first woman moderator of the General Assembly of the Church of Scotland. She chaired the General Assembly the following year.
 2006: Katharine Jefferts Schori, first woman presiding bishop of the Episcopal Church in the United States.
 2008: Kay Goldsworthy, first woman consecrated bishop in Australia; she was made a bishop of the Anglican Church of Australia.
 2014: Libby Lane, first woman consecrated bishop in the Church of England.
 2021: Sister Nathalie Becquart, first woman appointed as undersecretary to the Synod of Bishops.

Sports

 August 6, 1926: Gertrude Ederle, first woman to swim across the English Channel.
 1937: Grace Hudowalski was the ninth person and first woman to climb all 46 of the Adirondack High Peaks.
 1940s: Lois Fegan Farrell became the first female reporter to cover a professional hockey team in America.
 1960: Mary McGee becomes the first official female motorcycle racer in the United States by earning a license from the Federation Internationale de Motocyclisme. She is also the first woman to compete in the Baja 500 off-road race.
 1960: Wilma Rudolph, track and field champion, became the first American woman to win three gold medals in the Rome Olympics. She elevated women's track to a major presence in the United States. As a member of the black community, she is also regarded as a civil rights and women's rights pioneer. Along with other 1960 Olympic athletes such as Cassius Clay (who later became Muhammad Ali), Rudolph became an international star due to the first international television coverage of the Olympics that year.
 1967: Drahşan Arda (born 1945) is a Turkish former association football referee. She was confirmed as the world's first female football referee by FIFA cockart.
 November 27, 1968: Penny Ann Early, first woman to play major professional basketball, in an ABA game (Kentucky Colonels vs. Los Angeles Stars).
 August 15, 1970: Patricia Palinkas, first woman to play professionally in an American football game.
 January 1, 1972 - Women were officially welcomed into the United States Polo Association with Sue Sally Hale becoming the first woman member.
 May 16, 1975: Junko Tabei, first woman to reach the summit of Mount Everest.
1993: Lynn Hill does the first free ascent (FFA) of the 3,000-foot Nose Route on El Capitan (5.14a/b); one of the biggest prizes in big wall climbing.
 1993: Halli Reid became the first woman to swim across Lake Erie, swimming from Long Point, Ontario, to North East, Pennsylvania, in 17 hours.
 1994: Catherine Destivelle becomes the first woman to complete the winter free solo of the "north face trilogy of the Eiger, the Grandes Jorasses, and the Matterhorn.
October 18, 1997: Liz Heaston, first female to play and score in a college football game, kicking two extra points in the 1997 Linfield vs. Willamette football game.
 December 26, 2008: Sarah Thomas, first woman to officiate an NCAA football bowl game.
2009: Kei Taniguchi becomes the first woman to win the Piolet d'Or (Golden Ice Axe), the "Oscar" of Mountaineering.
 September 4, 2009: Carolynn Sells became the first woman to win a solo motorcycle race on the Snaefell Mountain Course in the Isle of Man when she won the Ultra Lightweight race at the 2009 Manx Grand Prix.
 May 17, 2010, Edurne Pasaban became the first woman to climb all of the fourteen eight-thousander peaks in the World.
May 4, 2012: Rosie Napravnik became the first woman jockey to win the Kentucky Oaks, riding Believe You Can.
 August 9, 2012: Shannon Eastin becomes the first woman to officiate a National Football League game in a pre-season matchup between the Green Bay Packers and the San Diego Chargers.
 2012: Anna Wardley, from England, became the first person to complete a solo swim around Portsea Island recognized by the British Long Distance Swimming Association.
 May 31, 2013: Lydia Nsekera became the first female FIFA Executive Committee member.
 May 18, 2013: Rosie Napravnik places third in the Preakness Stakes on Mylute, making her the first woman to have ridden in all three Triple Crown races. On June 8, 2013, she rode the filly Unlimited Budget to a 6th-place finish in the 2013 Belmont, becoming the first woman to ride all three Triple Crown races in the same year.
 June 2013: Ashley Freiberg became the first woman to claim an overall GT3 Cup Challenge victory in North America, winning the Porsche IMSA GT3 Cup Challenge.
 September 23, 2013: Sarah Outen arrived in a small harbor on the Aleutian island of Adak, and thus became the first person to row solo from Japan to Alaska, as well as the first woman to complete a mid-Pacific row from West to East.
 2013: Davie Jane Gilmour became the first woman to lead the board of directors for Little League.
 2013: UFC 157, which took place in February, featured not only the first women's fight in UFC history but also the first UFC event to be headlined by two female fighters (Ronda Rousey and Liz Carmouche).
 2013: On her fifth attempt and at the age of 64, Diana Nyad became the first person confirmed to swim from Cuba to Florida without the protection of a shark cage, swimming from Havana to Key West.
 2013: Scotland's solicitor general, Lesley Thomson, became the first woman to be appointed to Scottish Rugby's board.
 2013: Anna Wardley, from England, became the first woman to swim non-stop around the Isle of Wight.
 2013: Peggy O'Neal, an American-born lawyer, became the first woman in the Australian Football League to hold the position of club president, being chosen as the president of the Richmond Football Club.
 2013: Tracey Gaudry became the first woman appointed as vice president of the Union Cycliste Internationale.
2013: Adel Weir, former world number 53 from South Africa, became the first ever female squash coach hire at the Qatar Squash Federation.
2013: Maria Toor, a squash player from South Waziristan, became the winner of the first ever women's event in the Nash Cup in Canada by beating Milou van der Heijden of the Netherlands 13–11, 11–3, 11–9.
2013: Tatyana McFadden became the first athlete to win six gold medals at a championships during the 2013 IPC Athletics World Championships in Lyon. She claimed gold in every event from the 100 meters through to the 5,000 meters.
2013: Tatyana McFadden won the Boston, Chicago, London, and New York marathons in 2013. This makes her the first person – able-bodied or otherwise – to win the four major marathons in the same year. She also set a new course record for the Chicago Marathon (1 hour, 42 minutes, 35 seconds).
 2013: Denise Fejtek became the first woman to complete the "Peak to Heat Double" – the combination of summiting Mount Everest and finishing the Ironman Triathlon World Championship in Kona, Hawaii. She reached the Everest Summit on May 23, 2010, and finished the Hawaii Ironman in October 2013.
 2013: Sonya Baumstein became the first person to stand-up paddleboard across the Bering Strait.
 2013: Meredith Novack became the fastest person, and first woman, to pull a double crossing of the Auau Channel in Hawaii. Her time was 11 hours and one minute.
 2013: Rosie Napravnik won 17 races to become the first woman to capture the leading rider title at Keeneland.
 2013: Olivia Prokopova became the first woman to win the World Crazy Golf Championship.
 2013: Mia Hamm became the first woman inducted into the World Football Hall of Fame in Pachuca, Mexico.
 2013: Emily Bell became the first woman to kayak the length of Britain.
 2013: Casey Stoney became the first female member of the Professional Footballers' Association's management committee.
 2013: Jodi Eller became the first woman to complete the 1,515 mile Florida Circumnavigational Saltwater Paddling Trail.
 2013: On March 1, 2013, Privateers owner and president Nicole Kirnan served as the team's coach for the first time, making her the first woman to coach a professional hockey team in the United States.
 2014: Torah Bright became the first woman to qualify for three snowboard disciplines at a Winter Olympics, specifically snowboard cross, halfpipe and slopestyle.
 2014: Ashley Freiberg became the first woman to win an overall race in Continental Tire Challenge History when she won the Continental Tire SportsCar Challenge. Her co-driver was Shelby Blackstock.
 2014: The first women competed in ski jumping at the Olympics.
 2014: Jennifer Welter became the first woman non-kicker or placekick-holder to play in a men's pro football game; she played running back for the Texas Revolution.
 2014: Abbey Holmes became the first woman to kick 100 goals in one regular season of Australian Rules football.
 2014: Annabel Anderson, from New Zealand, became the first woman to cross Cook Strait standing on a paddleboard.
 2014: Peta Searle became the first woman appointed as a development coach in the Australian Football League when she was chosen by St Kilda as a development coach.
 2014: 16-year-old Katie Ormerod, from Britain, became the first female snowboarder to land a backside double cork 1080.
 2014: Shelby Osborne became the first female defensive back in American football when she was drafted by Campbellsville University in Kentucky.
 2014: Amélie Mauresmo became the first woman to coach a top male tennis player (specifically, Andy Murray).
 2014: Corinne Diacre became the first woman to coach a men's professional soccer team (Clermont Foot) in a competitive match in France on August 4, 2014, her 40th birthday.
 2014: Cecilia Brækhus, from Norway, became the first Norwegian and the first woman to hold all major world championship titles in her weight division (welterweight) in boxing.
 2014: On August 15, 2014, Mo'ne Davis was the first girl in Little League World Series history to pitch a winning game for the Taney Dragons and earned the win, and she was also the first girl to pitch a shutout in Little League postseason history.
 2014: Amy Hughes, from England, ran 53 marathons in 53 days, thus setting the record for the most marathons run on consecutive days by any person, male or female.
 2015: Jennifer Welter became the first woman hired to coach in men's pro football when the Texas Revolution of the Champions Indoor Football league announced that Welter was hired to coach linebackers and special teams.
 2019: GS Lakshmi, former Indian cricketer becomes the first female ICC match referee
 2021: First African-American female full-time NFL coach (Washington Football Team); Jennifer King.

Voting

Women's rights

See also

 
 
 
 
 First woman

Further reading
Timeline of Women in World History
Nine things you didn't know were invented by women BBC, 4 September 2017

References

Women
Firsts